Xu Pu  (14291499) was a minister during the reign of the Ming dynasty Hongzhi Emperor.

Biography
Xu Pu was a scholar in the palace, and successfully graduated after the highest Imperial examination as a jinshi, or "chosen scholar", in 1454 AD.
He entered the Grand Secretariat as a Minister in 1487 AD. He had a quiet, conservative style, which aimed at compromise and friendly relations with his colleagues. His predecessor was Liu Ji. Xu Pu wanted the Emperor to rein in the power of Li Guang and the Daoists, but failed with his protests. He was received in audience only once during his 12 years as Minister.

However, in 1497 AD Xu was entrusted with the preparation of the Collected Statutes of the Ming Dynasty, which were published after his death in 1509 AD.

He was known to be lenient to his subordinates and in private life he was distinguished for filial piety and charity. When he died in 1499 AD Xu left 800 mu of tax-free land to the poor of his clan and was canonised as Wen Jing.

See also
Collected Statutes of the Ming Dynasty

References
 古今姓氏族譜 Gujin Xingshi Zupu , Giles, Herbert, London: Bernard Quaritch / Shanghai: Kelly & Walsh (1898).

External links
  Cultural China

1429 births
1499 deaths
Senior Grand Secretaries of the Ming dynasty
People from Yixing
Politicians from Wuxi
Chinese legal scholars
Ming dynasty writers
Writers from Wuxi